The United States Senate Judiciary Subcommittee on Privacy, Technology and the Law is one of seven subcommittees within the Senate Judiciary Committee. Created at the start of the 112th Congress, it was disbanded at the beginning of the 116th Congress, but brought back during the 117th Congress. The current chair of the subcommittee is Senator Richard Blumenthal (D-CT).

Jurisdiction
The committee's jurisdiction extended to:

Oversight of laws and policies governing the collection, protection, use and dissemination of commercial information by the private sector, including online behavioral advertising, privacy within social networking websites and other online privacy issues; 
Enforcement and implementation of commercial information privacy laws and policies;
Use of technology by the private sector to protect privacy, enhance transparency and encourage innovation;
Privacy standards for the collection, retention, use and dissemination of personally identifiable commercial information; and
Privacy implications of new or emerging technologies.

Members, 118th Congress

Notable activities 
In May 2022, the subcommittee held a hearing titled "Platform Transparency: Understanding the Impact of Social Media". The hearing centered on issues pertaining to social media platforms, and evaluated proposals that would mandate platforms share information on how their algorithms operate with researchers.

References

External links
 Subcommittee on Privacy, Technology and the Law

Judiciary Privacy